Chhena poda is a cheese dessert from the Indian state of Odisha. Chhena poda literally means Baked Cheese in Odia.
It is made of well-kneaded homemade fresh cheese chhena, sugar, semolina, and is baked for several hours until it browns. Chhena poda is known as one of the Indian dessert whose flavor is predominantly derived from the caramelization of sugar.

History

Chhenapoda originated in the Odia village of Dasapalla in the first half of the twentieth century. The owner of a confectionery, Sudarsan Sahu decided to add sugar and seasonings to leftover chhena one night, and left it in the Indian Chulha that was still warm from earlier use. The next day, he was pleasantly surprised to find out what a scrumptious dessert he had created.

Chhenapoda Dibasa is being celebrated since 11 April 2022, the birth anniversary of Sudarsan Sahoo.

Preparation
Chhena poda is usually made at home during traditional festivals in Odisha, such as Durga Puja.  Since the mid-1980s, it has gradually found its place in restaurant menus across Odisha. Odisha Milk Federation is investing heavily in mass-producing and popularizing this delicacy, determined not to let this happen again.

See also
Rasabali
Rasagolla
Chhena gaja
Kheersagar
Chhena kheeri
Chhena jalebi
List of Indian sweets and desserts
Oriya cuisine

References

Indian cheese dishes
Indian desserts
Odia cuisine
Cheesecakes
Cheese desserts